The Steadfast society was an eighteenth century political club in Bristol that organised political support for Tory candidates.  It was opposed to the Whig supporting Union Club.

References

Political organisations based in the United Kingdom